María Helvezia Balta Salazar is a Peruvian politician. She is a Congresswoman representing Ancash for the period 2006–2011, and belongs to the Peruvian Aprista Party.

References

External links

 Official site

Living people
Year of birth missing (living people)
American Popular Revolutionary Alliance politicians
Women members of the Congress of the Republic of Peru
21st-century Peruvian women politicians
21st-century Peruvian politicians